John Hunter (born 1904) was a Scottish footballer who played as an inside left. He featured primarily for Falkirk where he spent seven seasons as a regular during a period when the team usually finished in a high position in the top division of the Scottish Football League. In 1927 he was selected as a member of a Scottish Football Association party which toured North America, but never received a full cap for Scotland.

In 1928 Hunter moved on to English football for three seasons with Reading, then had a spell in the League of Ireland with Brideville before returning to the south-east of England with Guildford City, where he was on the coaching staff as they won the Southern Football League title in 1937–38 while also still appearing for their reserve team.

References

Date of birth missing
1904 births
Date of death missing
Place of death missing
People from Stenhousemuir
Footballers from Falkirk (council area)
Association football inside forwards
Scottish footballers
Falkirk F.C. players
Reading F.C. players
Guildford City F.C. players
Armadale F.C. players
Scottish Football League players
English Football League players
Southern Football League players
League of Ireland players
Scottish expatriate sportspeople in Ireland
Expatriate association footballers in the Republic of Ireland
Scottish expatriate footballers